The No. 224 Squadron (Warlords) of the IAF is a Ground Attack squadron based at Jamnagar AFS. It was temporarily disbanded in 2007 after the retirement of MiG-23MF aircraft. The unit was resurrected in 2008 with Jaguar Darin II aircraft and continues to operate from Jamnagar.

The crest
No.224 Sqn crest depicts a warrior on a chariot proceeding to war. The chariot signifies the weapon platforms which are highly lethal and flexible, the horse signifying the power and strength and the warrior is at high state of readiness and aiming his weapons on the enemies.

History
No. 224 Sqn, IAF was raised on 4 July 1983 at Airforce Station Adampur under the command of Wg Cdr RA Massey, Vr C, as a part of Western Air Command. The unit was equipped with the Mig 23MF and assigned the Air defence role and later an additional peacetime role of Banner Target Towing. Later it moved to Jamnagar, its MiG-23s modified to tow targets.

No.224 Sqn was the last operator of the MiG-23MF before their retirement from the Indian Air Force in 2007. The final fly past of the closing ceremony was done by Wing Commander M. K. Singh flying a banner titles "End of an Era", Wing Commander Tapas Sahu, Squadron Leader Vijay Shelke and Wing Commander RS Jamdar.

Operations
Operation Meghdoot from 1985 to 1986.
Operation Safed Sagar during May 1999.

Awards and honours
No 224 Sqn was adjudged the best over all fighter squadron in Western Air Command during 1986-1987
Wg Cdr  Radhakrishnan Radhish Vayusena Medal 2006
Sqn Ldr SV Bal                Vayusena Medal 1991
WO      L Jha                 Commendation by CAS 1997
WO      HS Saini              Commendation by CAS 1989
Sgt     Tanwar RS             Commendation by CAS 1988
Sgt     K Damodaran           Commendation by CAS 1988
WO      Ravi Nandan           Commendation by CAS 1987
Sgt     Sagar SC              Commendation by CAS 1986

Aircraft

References

1983 establishments in India
2007 disestablishments in India
224
Military units and formations established in 1983
Military units and formations disestablished in 2007